Orinella is a genus of sea snails, marine gastropod mollusks in the family Pyramidellidae, the pyrams and their allies.

Species
Species within the genus Orinella include:
 Orinella africana (Bartsch, 1915)
 Orinella alfredensis (Bartsch, 1915)
 Orinella ebarana (Yokoyama, 1927)
 Orinella pulchella (A. Adams, 1854)

The following species were brought into synonymy:
 Orinella vanhyningi Bartsch, 1944 accepted as Syrnola vanhyningi (Bartsch, 1944)

References

External links
 To World Register of Marine Species

Pyramidellidae
Monotypic gastropod genera